This page provides details for the version history of the Microsoft's Windows Phone branded mobile operating systems, from the release of Windows Phone 7 in October 2010, which was preceded by Windows Mobile version 6.x.

Windows Phone 7 

Windows Phone 7 was the first release of the Windows Phone mobile client operating system, released worldwide on October 21, 2010, and in the United States on November 8, 2010.

Table of versions

Windows Phone 7.5 (Mango) 

At the 2011 Mobile World Congress, Steve Ballmer announced a major update to Windows Phone 7 due toward the end of the year, Windows Phone 7.5, codenamed Mango. The new OS would address many of the platform's shortcomings, including a mobile version of Internet Explorer 9 that supports the same web standards and graphical capability as the desktop version, multi-tasking of third-party apps, Twitter integration for the People Hub, and Windows Live SkyDrive access. Although the OS internally identifies itself as version 7.1, it is marketed as version 7.5 in all published materials intended for end-users.

Microsoft started rolling out Windows Phone 7.5 to both the United States and International markets on September 27, 2011. The first phones that came pre-loaded with Windows Phone 7.5 were released in the last quarter of 2011.

A minor update released in 2012 known as Tango, along with other bug fixes, would also lower the hardware requirements to allow for devices with 800 MHz CPUs and 256 MB of RAM to run Windows Phone. Certain resource-intensive features are also disabled on these phones, and the Windows Phone Store will also prevent the installation of apps that are considered to be too intensive for use on weaker hardware. The lower requirements were adopted in order to allow the development of lower-cost devices, particularly to target emerging markets such as China.

Table of versions

Windows Phone 7.8
Windows Phone 7.8 is the final major release of Windows Phone 7. It consists exclusively of user interface improvements backported from Windows Phone 8, as existing Windows Phone 7 devices can not be upgraded to due to changes to its architecture and hardware requirements. These include a home screen with the ability to resize live tiles, new accent color options, and an updated lock screen with support for Bing wallpapers. Unlike Windows Phone 8, the lock screen does not allow third-party apps to display notifications on it.

Table of versions

Windows Phone 8

GDR1 
General Distribution Release 1, a minor update known as Portico was rolled out in December 2012 that brought some improvements and bugfixes, including enhancements in Messaging, more efficient Bluetooth connectivity, and an "always-on" setting for WiFi connections, among other additional platform updates

GDR2 
Microsoft rolled out a package of minor updates called General Distribution Release 2, beginning in July 2013 and spanning the following months, depending on the manufacturer and carrier. Along with this update Nokia released its own update which updated the firmware of the user, namely Lumia Amber, which was available for only Lumia phones. The update brought many camera improvements and fixed some bugs in the cameras of existing Lumia phones.

GDR3 
On October 14, 2013, Microsoft released the third General Distribution Release update for Windows Phone 8, which would roll out to phones over the following months. Windows Phone Developers were among the first to receive the update under a new Developer Preview Program.

Table of versions

Windows Phone 8.1

GDR1 
General Distribution Release 1 (GDR1; also referred to as Update 1) adds new language and region support for Cortana, the option to organize apps into folders on the Start Screen, SMS forwarding of multiple messages, improvements to Xbox Music, a live tile for the Windows Phone Store and an option for sandboxing applications. In addition, Update 1/GDR1 also includes new VPN and Bluetooth features for enterprise users, as well as support for interactive cases such as HTC's "Dot View" case, larger "phablet" screen resolutions such as 1280x800, 540x960 qHD and 1280x768 and the Qualcomm QuickCharge 2.0 standard.

Microsoft has made several changes to Internet Explorer Mobile that brings the browser experience closer in line with the experiences on Safari (iOS) and Chrome (Android). To accomplish this, Microsoft moved away from open standards and adopted non-standard features used in Safari and Chrome, implemented browser detection, improved page rendering by detecting legacy WebKit features, brought support for HTML5, and fixed interoperability issues with bad HTML code.

GDR2 
Information regarding GDR2 (also referred to as Update 2) was released in February 2015 it was revealed that Microsoft was working on a 2nd update for Windows Phone 8.1 that would provide increased security for OEM's, add extra languages and additional technology support and is also reported to bring an anti-theft mode.

Table of versions

Windows 10 Mobile

Windows 10 Mobile was announced on January 21, 2015, as a mobile operating system for smartphones and tablets with screens smaller than 8 inches, with the first build released on February 12, 2015. It is the successor to Windows Phone 8.1 and replaced the Windows Phone brand, while Microsoft has since ceased active development of Windows 10 Mobile. Windows Phone 8.1 devices are  eligible for upgrade to Windows 10, pursuant of manufacturer and carrier support. Some features may vary depending on hardware compatibility.

See also 

 Android version history
 BlackBerry 10 version history
 Firefox OS version history
 iOS version history
 Palm OS version history
 Sailfish OS version history
 Symbian version history
 Tizen version history

References

Lists of operating systems
Mobile phones introduced in 2011
Smartphones
Windows Phone
Software version histories